South Delhi Lok Sabha constituency is one of the seven Lok Sabha constituencies in the Indian National Capital Territory of Delhi. This constituency came into existence in 1966.

The seat was a stronghold of the Bharatiya Janata Party for many years but in 2009, after delimitation, INC won this seat. Ramesh Bidhuri of the BJP is the MP representing the constituency since 2014.

Assembly segments
Following the delimitation of the parliamentary constituencies, since 2008, it comprises the following Delhi Vidhan Sabha segments:

From 1993 to 2008, it comprised the following Delhi Vidhan Sabha segments:
 Okhla
 Kalkaji
 Malviya Nagar (Polling stations 1–60 and 71–128)
 Hauz Khas
 R K Puram
 Delhi Cantt
 Janakpuri (Polling stations 1–91)
 Hari Nagar
 Tilak Nagar
 Rajouri Garden
 Sarojini Nagar (Polling stations 94–107)
 Gole Market (Polling stations 101–109)
 Kasturba Nagar (Polling stations 22 and 115–119)

From 1966 to 1993, South Delhi Lok Sabha constituency comprised the following Delhi Metropolitan Council segments:
 Delhi Cantt
 Okhla
 Malviya Nagar
 R K Puram
 Hauz Khas
 Ashok Nagar
 Tilak Nagar
 Rajouri Garden

Member of Parliament
The South Delhi Lok Sabha constituency was created in 1967. The list of Member of Parliament (MP) is as follows:

Election results

2019 general election

2014 general election

2009 general election

2004 general election

1999 general election

1998 general election

1996 general election

1991 general election

1989 general election

1984 general election
 Lalit Maken (Cong) : 215,898 votes   
 Vijay Kumar Malhotra (BJP) : 130,847

1985 bye-poll
 Arjun Singh (Cong) : 161,744 votes   
 V.K. Malhotra (BJP) : 121,830

1980 general election
 Charanjit Singh (Cong - I) :  150,513 votes   
 Vijay Kumar Malhotra (Janata Party) : 146,413
 Shashi Bhushan (Cong - Urs) : 6339
 Balraj Madhok (Ind) : 2196 votes

1967 general election
 Balraj Madhok (BJS) : 105,611 votes  
 R. Singh (INC) : 69290

References

See also
 List of Constituencies of the Lok Sabha
 Outer Delhi (Lok Sabha constituency)

Lok Sabha constituencies in Delhi
1966 establishments in Delhi
Constituencies established in 1966